Bad Freienwalde (Oder) station is a railway station in the spa town of Bad Freienwalde (Oder), located in the Märkisch-Oderland district in Brandenburg, Germany.

References

Railway stations in Brandenburg
Railway stations in Germany opened in 1866
1866 establishments in Prussia
Buildings and structures in Märkisch-Oderland